Sirian or Sirians may refer to:
 Sirian, Iran, a village in Isfahan Province, Iran
 George Sirian (1818–1891), American naval officer

Fictional aliens
 Human adversaries in Lucky Starr and the Pirates of the Asteroids and other Lucky Starr novels by Isaac Asimov writing as Paul French
 Citizens of the Sirian Empire in The Sirian Experiments by Doris Lessing
 An alien race in The Age of the Pussyfoot by Frederik Pohl
 An alien race in Wasp (novel) by Eric Frank Russell
 An alien race in Serious Sam
 Alien invaders in XF5700 Mantis

See also
 Sirianism, the position that Giuseppe Cardinal Siri was elected Pope in the 1958 papal conclave
 Siriano, a Tucanoan people indigenous to Colombia and Brazil
 Sirianus, the Catepan of Italy from 1062 to 1064
 Sirius in fiction
The Sirius Mystery, a non-fiction book by Robert K. G. Temple
 Syriacs, or the Assyrian people
 Syrian (disambiguation)